Dolichoderus turneri is a species of ant in the genus Dolichoderus. Described by Forel in 1902, the species is endemic to Australia.

References

Dolichoderus
Hymenoptera of Australia
Insects described in 1902